Aliabad is a village and municipality in the Lerik District of Azerbaijan.

References 

Populated places in Lerik District